Stanley Bergen McGregor (11 May 1895 – 26 July 1964) was an Australian rules footballer who played with Geelong in the Victorian Football League (VFL).

Notes

External links 

1895 births
1964 deaths
Australian rules footballers from Victoria (Australia)
Geelong Football Club players